A welding helmet is a type of personal protective equipment used in performing certain types of welding to protect the eyes, face, and neck from flash burn, sparks, infrared and ultraviolet light, and intense heat. The modern welding helmet used today was first introduced in 1937 by Willson Products.

Welding helmets are most commonly used in arc welding processes such as shielded metal arc welding, gas tungsten arc welding, and gas metal arc welding. They are necessary to prevent arc eye, a painful condition where the cornea is inflamed. Welding helmets can also prevent retina burns, which can lead to a loss of vision. Both conditions are caused by unprotected exposure to the highly concentrated infrared and ultraviolet rays emitted by the welding arc. Ultraviolet emissions from the welding arc can also damage uncovered skin, causing a sunburn-like condition in a relatively short period of welding. In addition to the radiation, gases or splashes can also be a hazard to the skin and the eyes.

Most welding helmets include a window covered with a filter called a lens shade, through which the welder can see to work. The window may be made of tinted glass, tinted plastic, or a variable-density filter made from a pair of polarized lenses. Different lens shades are needed for different welding processes. For example, metal inert gas (MIG) and tungsten inert gas (TIG) welding are low-intensity processes, so a lighter lens shade will be preferred.

The shade of lens that is suitable depends on the current rating of the weld. In the United States, OSHA recommends DIN shade numbers as shown in the following table:

Safety
All welding helmets are susceptible to damages such as cracks that can compromise the protection from ultraviolet and infrared rays. In addition to protecting the eyes, the helmet protects the face from hot metal sparks generated by the arc and from UV damage. When overhead welding, a leather skull cap and shoulder cover are used to prevent head and shoulder burns.

Auto-darkening filters

In 1981, Swedish manufacturer Hornell International introduced an LCD electronic shutter that darkens automatically when sensors detect the bright welding arc, the Speedglas Auto-Darkening Filter.

With such electronic auto-darkening helmets, the welder no longer has to get ready to weld and then nod their head to lower the helmet over their face. The advantage is that the welder does not need to adjust the position of welding helmet manually which not only saves time but also reduces the risk of exposure to the harmful light generated by the welding process.

In January 2004, 3M acquired all assets of Hornell, including the Adflo and Speedglas auto darkening helmets brand name and patents. Speedglas helmets are now sold by 3M.

ANSI standards
In the United States, the industry standard for welding helmets is ANSI Z87.1+ which specifies performance of a wide variety of eye protection devices. The standard requires that auto-darkening helmets provide full protection against both UV and IR even when they are not in the darkened state. The standard is voluntary, so buyers should confirm that the helmet is ANSI Z87.1 compliant (indicated by appropriate labeling).

See also
 Welding goggles, used in torch welding

Notes

Further reading
Jeffus, Larry (1999). Welding: Principles and Applications. Albany: Thomson Delmar.  .

Helmets
Welding safety
Protective gear
Functional masks